Kenneth Ray Plum (born November 3, 1941) is an American politician and Democratic member of the Virginia House of Delegates, representing the 36th District since 1982. He earlier served from 1978 through 1980. His district includes a large part of Fairfax County, including the entirety of Reston.

Plum was selected as chair of the House Democratic caucus on January 14, 2009. He was previously a chair of the Democratic Party of Virginia. He currently serves as Caucus Chair Emeritus. He also serves as the Chair of the Agriculture, Chesapeake and Natural Resources Committee.

Electoral history

References

External links 
 
 Member Bio
 Ken Plum Bio

|-

1941 births
20th-century American politicians
21st-century American politicians
Democratic Party of Virginia chairs
Living people
Democratic Party members of the Virginia House of Delegates
Old Dominion University alumni
People from Reston, Virginia
People from Shenandoah, Virginia
United Church of Christ members
Curry School of Education alumni
American gun control activists